"Shanghai Honey" is the third single by the Japanese band Orange Range. It was released on July 16, 2003.

Track listing
 "Shanghai Honey"
 "New Tokyo Machine"
 "Shanghai Honey" - Ryukyudisco Remix
 "Shanghai Honey" - Shanghai Styl

Charts
The single reached number 5 in the Oricon chart, charted for 38 weeks, and sold 240,831 copies.

References

External links
Official website

2003 singles
Orange Range songs
2003 songs